Larry Rucchin (12 May 1967 – 20 June 2002) was an Italian ice hockey player. He competed in the men's tournament at the 1998 Winter Olympics.

References

External links
 

1967 births
2002 deaths
Ice hockey people from Ontario
Italian ice hockey players
Olympic ice hockey players of Italy
Ice hockey players at the 1998 Winter Olympics
Sportspeople from Thunder Bay